John Lawn may refer to:

 John C. Lawn, Administrator of the Drug Enforcement Administration 
 John Lawn (miner) (1840–1905), New Zealand goldminer and mine manager
 John J. Lawn, American state legislator in the Massachusetts House of Representatives